The 1988 North Carolina lieutenant gubernatorial election was held on November 8, 1988. Republican nominee Jim Gardner defeated Democratic nominee Tony Rand with 50.64% of the vote.

Primary elections
Primary elections were held on May 3, 1988.

Democratic primary

Candidates
Tony Rand, State Senator
Harold W. Hardison, State Senator
H. Parks Helms, former State Representative
Frank Jordan
Robert L. Hannon

Results

Republican primary

Candidates
Jim Gardner, U.S. Representative
William T. "Bill" Boyd, State Representative
Wendell H. Sawyer, former State Senator

Results

General election

Candidates
Jim Gardner, Republican
Tony Rand, Democratic

Results

References

North Carolina
1988
Gubernatorial